Events in the year 2018 in Djibouti.

Incumbents
President: Ismaïl Omar Guelleh
Prime Minister: Abdoulkader Kamil Mohamed

Events

23 February – Djiboutian parliamentary election, 2018

19 May - Cyclone Sagar makes landfall, kills 2 in Djibouti and affects 20,000 others

Deaths

18 March – Barkat Gourad Hamadou, former Prime Minister (b. 1930).

References

 
2010s in Djibouti 
Years of the 21st century in Djibouti 
Djibouti 
Djibouti